Tarlscough is a hamlet in the West Lancashire district, in the English county of Lancashire.

Environment
The main feature of the hamlet is Martin Mere Wetland Centre, which is a major attraction for the North West of England as it is a site of special scientific interest, a special protection area and a Ramsar site.

Transport
The nearest train station is New Lane railway station which is a 1-mile walk south from Martin Mere. There are three roads running through the hamlet, Fish Lane to the north west, Tarlscough Lane to the south east and Marsh Moss Lane to the south.

References

External links

Hamlets in Lancashire
Burscough